Hans Alexis Martínez Cabrera (born 4 January 1987) is a Chilean former footballer who mainly played as a central defender, but he could also play as a left back or defensive midfielder.

Club career
Born in Santiago, Martínez joined Universidad Católica's youth system in 1998, aged 11, and made his first-team debuts in 2007. Martínez scored his first goal on 6 October 2008, in a 5–3 away win over Universidad de Concepción. In the following three seasons he was an undisputed starter, losing his place, however, in the 2012 season.

In July 2013, Martínez rejected a new four-year deal from the UC, and after being linked to Colo-Colo and Universidad de Chile in August, he stated a desire to move abroad in December.

On 27 December 2013 Martínez joined La Liga side UD Almería on loan until the end of the season. He made his debut in the top flight of Spanish football on 12 April of the following year, starting in a 0–4 loss at Real Madrid.

On 19 July 2014, Martínez returned to Chile, joining O'Higgins.

After having contractual conflicts with Lautaro de Buin and his manager Carlos Encinas, he was given severance pay and released on April 7, 2021. A year later, he confirmed his retirement from football.

International career
After appearing with the Chile under-17s at the 2003 South American Under-17 Football Championship, Martínez was a member of the Chile under-20 squad, which finished fourth at the 2007 South American Youth Championship in Paraguay, being a regular starter. He appeared at the 2007 FIFA U-20 World Cup, and the following year appeared at the Toulon Tournament.

Martínez made his full squad debut on 26 January 2008, starting in a 0–0 draw against Japan.

Career statistics

Club

Honours

Club
Universidad Católica
Primera División (1): 2010
Copa Chile (1): 2011

International

FIFA U-20 World Cup: third place: 2007

References

External links

1987 births
Living people
Footballers from Santiago
Association football central defenders
Chilean footballers
Chile youth international footballers
Chile under-20 international footballers
Chile international footballers
Chilean Primera División players
Segunda División Profesional de Chile players
La Liga players
Club Deportivo Universidad Católica footballers
UD Almería players
O'Higgins F.C. footballers
Audax Italiano footballers
Universidad de Concepción footballers
Lautaro de Buin footballers
Chilean expatriate footballers
Chilean expatriate sportspeople in Spain
Expatriate footballers in Spain